Adam Higson (born 19 May 1987) is an English professional rugby league footballer who last played as a er for the Leigh Centurions in the Betfred Championship.

He has previously played for Leigh Centurions in the Championship and the Super League, and on loan from the Leigh Centurions at the Swinton Lions in the second tier. Higson has also played for the Toronto Wolfpack in the Championship.

Background
Higson was born in Leigh, Greater Manchester, England.

Career
Higson made his senior début for the Leigh Centurions on 15 February 2009 in a Northern Rail Cup match against the London Skolars. His league début came a month later on 15 March in a Championship match against the Sheffield Eagles.

In 2012, Higson spent a season on loan at the Swinton Lions.

In December 2017 Higson signed a one-year deal with the Toronto Wolfpack.

References

External links
Toronto Wolfpack profile
Leigh Centurions profile

1987 births
Living people
English rugby league players
Leigh Leopards players
Rugby league wingers
Rugby league players from Leigh, Greater Manchester
Swinton Lions players
Toronto Wolfpack players